Mika Karni is an Israeli pop singer and trained violinist.

Discography
 Mika Karni (1997)
 Sipur Amiti ("A True Story") (2000)
 Another World (2001)
 Mi'rega Le'rega ("Minute by Minute" / "Moment by Moment") (2002)
 Lighthouse (2004)
 Simple and Good (2006)

Well-known songs:
 "Migdalor"{"Lighthouse"}
 "Rahamim"{"Mercy"}
 "Nishakti bahura"{"I've kissed a young lady"}
 "Mitchell"

References

External links

Living people
21st-century Israeli women singers
Year of birth missing (living people)